Andrzej Orłoś (16 February 1934 – 29 April 2018) was a Polish equestrian. He competed in two events at the 1960 Summer Olympics.

References

External links
 

1934 births
2018 deaths
Polish male equestrians
Olympic equestrians of Poland
Equestrians at the 1960 Summer Olympics
People from Łańcut County